The Tahiti reed warbler (Acrocephalus caffer) is a songbird in the genus Acrocephalus. It used to be placed in the "Old World warbler" assemblage (Sylviidae), but is now in the newly recognized marsh warbler family Acrocephalidae. It is endemic to the island of Tahiti.

Most taxonomists regard Garrett's reed warbler and the Moorea reed warbler as distinct. They used to be considered subspecies.

As a whole, the Tahiti reed warbler was classified as a vulnerable species by the IUCN.

Footnotes

References 
 BirdLife International (BLI) (2008): [2008 IUCN Redlist status changes]. Retrieved 23 May 2008.

External links 

BirdLife Species Factsheet

Tahiti reed warbler
Endemic birds of Tahiti
Tahiti reed warbler